Fernando Coello Layton (April 11, 1847 – June 22, 1926) was an American lawyer and politician who served as a U.S. representative from Ohio for three terms from 1891 to 1897.

Early life and career 
Born near St. Johns, Auglaize County, Ohio, Layton attended the public schools and Wittenberg College, Springfield, Ohio.
He studied law.
He was admitted to the bar in 1869 and practiced in Wapakoneta, Ohio.
County school examiner.
He served as prosecuting attorney of Auglaize County 1875-1878.
He served as captain of Company G, Ohio National Guard from 1878 to 1883.

Congress 
Layton was elected as a Democrat to the Fifty-second, Fifty-third, and Fifty-fourth Congresses (March 4, 1891 – March 3, 1897).
He was not a candidate for renomination in 1896.
He resumed the practice of his profession in Wapakoneta, Ohio.

Layton was elected Common Pleas Judge in 1908.
He was reelected in 1914 and in 1920 and served until his resignation on June 9, 1926.

Death
He died in Wapakoneta, Ohio, on June 22, 1926.
He was interred in Greenlawn Cemetery.

References

1847 births
1926 deaths
People from Wapakoneta, Ohio
Wittenberg University alumni
County district attorneys in Ohio
United States Army officers
Democratic Party members of the United States House of Representatives from Ohio